Zelene Pole is a village in Volnovakha Raion (district) in Donetsk Oblast of eastern Ukraine, at about  west by south from the centre of Donetsk city and at about  west from the border of Zaporizhzhia Oblast. It belongs to Velyka Novosilka Hromada, one of the hromadas of Ukraine.

The village came under attack by Russian forces in 2022, during the Russian invasion of Ukraine.

References

Villages in Volnovakha Raion